Betke is a surname. Notable people with the surname include:

 Bernard Betke (1891–1975), American sport shooter
 Siegfried Betke (1917–1988), German Luftwaffe bomber pilot
 Stefan Betke (born 1967), German electronic music artist, see Pole (musician)
 Wolfgang Betke (born 1958), German Painter and Performance Artist

See also
 Beke (surname)
 Betker